Wrestling at the 2021 Summer Deaflympics  was held in Caxias Do Sul, Brazil from 10 to 14 May 2022.

Medal summary

Team ranking

Medalists

Men's freestyle

Men's Greco-Roman

Participating nations 
128 wrestlers from 19 countries:

  (1)
  (10)
  (2)
  (6)
  (1)
  (6)
  (4)
  (13)
  (16)
  (16)
  (4)
  (1)
  (1)
  (3)
  (1)
  (16)
  (10)
  (14)
  (3)

Belarusian and Russian wrestlers did not compete at the event after a ban as a result of the Russian invasion of Ukraine.

References

External links
 Deaflympics 2021

2021 Summer Deaflympics
2022 in sport wrestling
International wrestling competitions hosted by Brazil